The Mid-Indiana Conference, or MIC, was a high school athletic conference which was located in northcentral Indiana, USA.  This conference served many high schools located in Cass, Hamilton, Howard, and Miami Counties. The conference dissolved at the end on the 2014-15 academic school year.

History
The Mid-Indiana Conference can trace its roots back to the late 1940s, when school consolidation reduced the Howard County Conference from nine schools to three in the matter of three years. These three remaining schools joined three nearby schools from Miami County and began the new Howard-Miami Conference. The conference renamed itself the Tri-County Conference in 1955, as two schools from Grant County joined. Further school consolidation reduced membership to four schools by 1965, forcing the conference to reach out of its footprint to find similar-sized schools. This expansion also brought with it the change to its current and final name.

Though only one member has consolidated since the MIC name has taken hold, geography, size differences, and competitiveness have all caused various roster changes through the years, with membership as many as nine schools and as few as six. However, membership stabilized after 2000, when Hamilton Heights joined from the folding Rangeline Conference. This ended in 2015, as Eastern and Taylor elected to join an expanding Hoosier Heartland Conference. Maconaquah and Peru are also leaving to join the Three Rivers Conference, while the four remaining schools are off to the Hoosier Athletic Conference.

Membership

Membership timeline

2006-2007 Boys' Basketball
 Western, Frankfort Sectional 3A Champions
 Lewis Cass, Manchester Sectional 2A Champions
 Northwestern, Taylor Sectional 2A Champions, Blackford Regional 2A Champions, Warsaw Semi-State 2A Champions, 2A State Champions

State titles

Eastern Comets
 Softball- 1A (2003)
 Softball- 2A (2005)
 Boys' Golf (2001)
 Jeremy Ashcraft - Pole Vault (1994)
 Bethany Neeley - 1600 Meters (2012)
 Brittany Neeley - 800 Meters (2013)
 Bethany Neeley - 1600 Meters (2013)
 Jessica Sprinkles, Sarah Wagner, Brittany Neeley, Bethany Neeley - 4 x 800 Relay (2013)

Hamilton Heights Huskies
 Sierra Brown - 100M Hurdles (2013)

Lewis Cass Kings
 Basketball- 2A (2003)
 Softball- 2A (2006)
 Softball- 2A (2008)

Northwestern Tigers
 Basketball- 2A (2007)

Peru Tigers
 Tennis (1971)

Taylor Titans
 Baseball- 2A (2000)

Western Panthers
 Joe Swartz, Wrestling, 98 lbs (1977)
 Ray Shepherd, Wrestling, 138 lbs (1984)
 Jeff Glick, Swimming, 200 Individual Medley (1985)
 Michelle Faulkner, Track & Field, 800 Meters (1988)
 Chad Shepherd, Wrestling, 135 lbs (1991)
 Kylee Wells, Diving, (2000)
 Ted Brown, Swimming, 200 Individual Medley, 500 Freestyle, Herman F. Keller Mental Attitude Award (2003)
 Brandon Youngdale, High Jump (2006)
 Girls' Golf (2001)
 Baseball-3A (2012)
 Girls'-3A Basketball (2014)
 Marching Band (16 titles)

State Runner-Ups

Eastern Comets
 Tennis (Jorge Burmicky) (2004)
 Bethany Neeley - 800 Meters (2011)
 Girls' Basketball (2A) (2013)

Hamilton Heights Huskies
 Football (2012)
 Girls' Basketball (2013)

Lewis Cass
 Football (2008)
 Baseball (2008)

Northwestern Tigers
 Baseball (2005)
 Football (1992)
 Girls' Golf (1996)

Western Panthers
 Softball (1993)
 Softball (1994)
 Girls' Golf (2002)
 Kyle Walsh, 1600 meters (2004)
 Girls' Golf (2004)

Neighboring conferences
North Central Conference

See also
Hoosier Hysteria

References

External links
 Mid-Indiana Conference Website

Indiana high school athletic conferences
High school sports conferences and leagues in the United States